George L. Stuart Jr. is a former state senator who represented the Orlando area in Florida. His father, George Stuart Sr., owned an office supply company, George Stuart Inc. His brother Jacob V. Stuart was also involved in politics, assisting with various political campaigns.

Stuart received a B.A. degree in Economics from the University of Florida and an M.B.A. from Harvard University's Graduate School of Business. He was elected to the Orlando City Council in 1972, served in the Florida State Senate from 1978 until 1990 as a member of the Democratic Party, and ran for governor. After his tenure in the state senate he was Secretary and Chief Executive Officer of the State of Florida's Department of Business and Professional Regulation from 1991 until January 1995.

References

Florida state senators
20th-century American politicians

Year of birth missing (living people)
Living people
University of Florida alumni
Harvard Business School alumni
American chief executives
Florida city council members